In numerical linear algebra, the Jacobi eigenvalue algorithm is an iterative method for the calculation of the eigenvalues and eigenvectors of a real symmetric matrix (a process known as diagonalization). It is named after Carl Gustav Jacob Jacobi, who first proposed the method in 1846, but only became widely used in the 1950s with the advent of computers.

Description 
Let  be a symmetric matrix, and  be a Givens rotation matrix. Then:

Furthermore,  has entries:

Since  is orthogonal,  and  have the same Frobenius norm  (the square-root sum of squares of all components), however we can choose  such that , in which case  has a larger sum of squares on the diagonal:

Set this equal to 0, and rearrange:

if 

In order to optimize this effect, Sij should be the off-diagonal element with the largest absolute value, called the pivot.

The Jacobi eigenvalue method repeatedly performs rotations until the matrix becomes almost diagonal. Then the elements in the diagonal are approximations of the (real) eigenvalues of S.

Convergence 

Now . This implies
i.e. the sequence of Jacobi rotations converges at least linearly by a factor    to a diagonal matrix.

A number of  Jacobi rotations is called a sweep; let  denote the result. The previous estimate yields
 ,
i.e. the sequence of sweeps converges at least linearly with a factor  ≈  .

However the following result of Schönhage yields locally quadratic convergence. To this end let S have m distinct eigenvalues    with multiplicities    and let  d > 0 be the smallest distance of two different eigenvalues. Let us call a number of

 

Jacobi rotations a Schönhage-sweep. If    denotes the result then
   .

Thus convergence becomes quadratic as soon as

Cost 

Each Jacobi rotation can be done in O(n) steps when the pivot element p is known. However the search for p requires inspection of all N ≈  n2 off-diagonal elements. We can reduce this to O(n) complexity too if we introduce an additional index array    with the property that   is the index of the largest element in row i, (i = 1, ..., n − 1) of the current S. Then the indices of the pivot (k, l)  must be one of the pairs . Also the updating of the index array can be done in O(n) average-case complexity: First, the maximum entry in the updated rows k and l can be found in O(n) steps. In the other rows i, only the entries in columns k and l change. If  should be equal to k or l and the corresponding entry decreased during the update, the maximum over row i has to be found from scratch in O(n) complexity. However, this will happen on average only once per rotation. Thus, each rotation has  O(n) and one sweep O(n3) average-case complexity, which is equivalent to one matrix multiplication. Additionally the    must be initialized before the process starts, which can be done in n2 steps.

Typically the Jacobi method converges within numerical precision after a small number of sweeps. Note that multiple eigenvalues reduce the number of iterations since .

Algorithm 

The following algorithm is a description of the Jacobi method in math-like notation.

 procedure jacobi(S ∈ Rn×n; out e ∈ Rn; out E ∈ Rn×n)
   var
     i, k, l, m, state ∈ N
     s, c, t, p, y, d, r ∈ R
     ind ∈ Nn
     changed ∈ Ln
 
   function maxind(k ∈ N) ∈ N ! index of largest off-diagonal element in row k
     m := k+1
     for i := k+2 to n do
       if │Ski│ > │Skm│ then m := i endif
     endfor
     return m
   endfunc
 
   procedure update(k ∈ N; t ∈ R) ! update ek and its status
     y := ek; ek := y+t
     if changedk and (y=ek) then changedk := false; state := state−1
     elsif (not changedk) and (y≠ek) then changedk := true; state := state+1
     endif
   endproc
 
   procedure rotate(k,l,i,j ∈ N) ! perform rotation of Sij, Skl
     ┌   ┐    ┌     ┐┌   ┐
     │Skl│    │c  −s││Skl│
     │   │ := │     ││   │
     │Sij│    │s   c││Sij│
     └   ┘    └     ┘└   ┘
   endproc
 
   ! init e, E, and arrays ind, changed
   E := I; state := n
   for k := 1 to n do indk := maxind(k); ek := Skk; changedk := true endfor
   while state≠0 do ! next rotation
     m := 1 ! find index (k,l) of pivot p
     for k := 2 to n−1 do
       if │Sk indk│ > │Sm indm│ then m := k endif
     endfor
     k := m; l := indm; p := Skl
     ! calculate c = cos φ, s = sin φ
     y := (el−ek)/2; d := │y│+√(p2+y2)
     r := √(p2+d2); c := d/r; s := p/r; t := p2/d
     if y<0 then s := −s; t := −t endif
     Skl := 0.0; update(k,−t); update(l,t)
     ! rotate rows and columns k and l
     for i := 1 to k−1 do rotate(i,k,i,l) endfor
     for i := k+1 to l−1 do rotate(k,i,i,l) endfor
     for i := l+1 to n do rotate(k,i,l,i) endfor
     ! rotate eigenvectors     for i := 1 to n do
       ┌   ┐    ┌     ┐┌   ┐
       │Eik│    │c  −s││Eik│
       │   │ := │     ││   │
       │Eil│    │s   c││Eil│
       └   ┘    └     ┘└   ┘
     endfor
     ! update all potentially changed indi     for i := 1 to n do indi := maxind(i) endfor
   loop
 endproc

 Notes 

1. The logical array changed holds the status of each eigenvalue. The integer state  counts the number of components of changed which have the value true. Iteration stops as soon as state = 0. This means that none of the approximations   has recently changed its value and thus it is not very likely that this will happen if iteration continues. Here it is assumed that floating point operations are optimally rounded to the nearest floating point number.

2. The upper triangle of the matrix S is destroyed while the lower triangle and the diagonal are unchanged. Thus it is possible to restore S if necessary according to

 for k := 1 to n−1 do ! restore matrix S     for l := k+1 to n do
         Skl := Slk
     endfor
 endfor

3. The eigenvalues are not necessarily in descending order. This can be achieved by a simple sorting algorithm.

 for k := 1 to n−1 do
     m := k     for l := k+1 to n do
         if el > em then
             m := l         endif
     endfor
     if k ≠ m then
         swap em,ek
         swap Em,Ek
     endif
 endfor

4. The algorithm is written using matrix notation (1 based arrays instead of 0 based).

5. When implementing the algorithm, the part specified using matrix notation must be performed simultaneously.

6. This implementation does not correctly account for the case in which one dimension is an independent subspace.  For example, if given a diagonal matrix, the above implementation will never terminate, as none of the eigenvalues will change.  Hence, in real implementations, extra logic must be added to account for this case.

 Example 

Let 

Then jacobi produces the following eigenvalues and eigenvectors after 3 sweeps (19 iterations) :

 Applications for real symmetric matrices 

When the eigenvalues (and eigenvectors) of a symmetric matrix are known, the following
values are easily calculated.

Singular values
It is the largest singular value of A. In case of a symmetric matrix it is the largest absolute value of its eigenvectors and thus equal to its spectral radius.

Condition number
In case of a symmetric matrix it is the absolute value of the quotient of the largest and smallest eigenvalue. Matrices with large condition numbers can cause numerically unstable results: small perturbation can result in large errors. Hilbert matrices are the most famous ill-conditioned matrices. For example, the fourth-order Hilbert matrix has a condition of 15514, while for order 8 it is 2.7 × 108.

Rank
A matrix A has rank r if it has r columns that are linearly independent while the remaining columns are linearly dependent on these. Equivalently, r is the dimension of the range of A. Furthermore it is the number of nonzero singular values.
In case of a symmetric matrix r is the number of nonzero eigenvalues. Unfortunately because of rounding errors numerical approximations of zero eigenvalues may not be zero (it may also happen that a numerical approximation is zero while the true value is not). Thus one can only calculate the numerical rank by making a decision which of the eigenvalues are close enough to zero.

Pseudo-inverse
The pseudo inverse of a matrix A is the unique matrix  for which AX and XA are symmetric and for which AXA = A,  XAX = X  holds. If A is nonsingular, then '.
When procedure jacobi (S, e, E) is called, then the relation  holds where Diag(e)  denotes the diagonal matrix with vector e on the diagonal. Let  denote the vector where   is replaced by  if   and by 0  if   is (numerically close to) zero.

Least squares solution
If matrix A  does not have full rank, there may not be a solution of the linear system  Ax = b. In case of a symmetric matrix S as before, one has .

Matrix exponential
In the same way, f(S)  can be calculated in an obvious way for any (analytic) function f.

Linear differential equations
The differential equation  x'  = Ax, x(0) = a has the solution  x(t) = exp(t A) a. For a symmetric matrix S, it follows that  .
Let   be the vector space spanned by the eigenvectors of S which correspond to a negative eigenvalue and  analogously for the positive eigenvalues. If   then  i.e. the equilibrium point 0 is attractive to x(t).

  Generalizations  

The Jacobi Method has been generalized to complex Hermitian matrices, general nonsymmetric real and complex matrices as well as block matrices.

Since singular values of a real matrix are the square roots of the eigenvalues of the symmetric matrix  it can also be used for the calculation of these values. For this case, the method is modified in such a way that S'' must not be explicitly calculated which reduces the danger of round-off errors.

The Jacobi Method is also well suited for parallelism.

References

Further reading 

 
 
 
 
 
 Yousef Saad: "Revisiting the (block) Jacobi subspace rotation method for the symmetric eigenvalue problem", Numerical Algorithms, vol.92 (2023), pp.917-944. https://doi.org/10.1007/s11075-022-01377-w .

External links 
Matlab implementation of Jacobi algorithm that avoids trigonometric functions
C++11 implementation

Numerical linear algebra
Articles with example pseudocode